Anna Łajming (née Anna Żmuda Trzebiatowska; 24 July 1904 in the Kashubian village of Przymuszewo, Chojnice County – 13 July 2003 in Słupsk, Pomeranian Voivodeship, Poland), one of thirteen children born to Jan and Marianna Żmuda Trzebiatowski. 

Although Anna Łajming was a prolific writer of Kashubian and Polish short stories, novels, memoirs, and plays, she did not publish her first work until 1958. As a young woman, she did clerical work in various towns including Tczew, where she met and married in 1929 a Tsarist Russian refugee named Nikolai Łajming. They were the parents of a daughter, Wera, and a son, Włodzimierz. In 1953 she and her family moved to Słupsk, where her husband's White Russian background would attract less unfavorable notice. In 2011, Blanche Krbechek and Stanisław Frymark published The Four Leafed Clover, an English translation of her 1985 short story collection Czterolistna Koniczyna.

In 1974, Anna Łajming was awarded the "Stolem" medal by the Kashubian-Pomeranian Association for her contributions to Kashubian culture. On 29 March 2000 she was named an honorary citizen of the city of Słupsk. In 2005, the city of Słupsk named Anna Łajming Street (ulica ul. Anny Łajming) in her honor.

References

Kashubians
Kashubian culture
Kashubian literature
1904 births
1993 deaths
People from Chojnice County
People from West Prussia
Recipient of the Meritorious Activist of Culture badge